Edward Geoffrey Simons Parrinder (April 10, 1910 – June 16, 2005) — known as E.G. Parrinder or Geoffrey Parrinder — was a professor of Comparative Religion at King's College London, a Methodist minister, and the author of over 30 books. At least one — What World Religions Teach Us (1968) — achieved bestseller status. He was an authority, and pioneering researcher, on West African indigenous religions.

Biography

Parrinder was Professor of the Comparative Study of Religion in the University of London. After ordination (1936) he spent twenty years teaching in West Africa and Studying African religions, before becoming the founder member of the Department of Religious Studies in University College of Ibadan, Nigeria.

He traveled widely  in Africa, and in India, Pakistan, Ceylon, Burma, Israel, Jordan and Turkey and held lecturing appointments in Australia, India and America and at Oxford. He worked as a missionary in Benin and Côte d'Ivoire for nearly two decades beginning in 1933, and became an authority on indigenous West African religions.

From 1958 until his retirement in 1977, he taught at King's College London. Among his students there was the future Anglican Archbishop Desmond Tutu.

Books

West African Religion: Illustrated from the Beliefs and Practices of Yoruba, Ewe, Akan and Kindred Peoples  (1949); London: Epworth Press
2nd edition (1961) as West African Religion: A Study of the Beliefs and Practices of Akan, Ewe, Yoruba, Ibo and Kindred Peoples
African Psychology (1951)
Religion In An African City (1953)
African Traditional Religion, London: SPCK, (1954)
2nd edition (19??)
3rd edition (1970); Harper Forum Books/Greenwood Pub. Group 
The Story Of Ketu (1956)
2nd edition as The Story Of Ketu: An Ancient Yoruba Kingdom (1967); Ibadan University Press
Witchcraft: European and African (1958), London: Faber & Faber, (1963), (1970) 
Also published as Witchcraft: A Critical Study Of The Belief In Witchcraft From The Records Of Witch Hunting In Europe Yesterday And Africa Today 
An Introduction to Asian Religions (1958); S.P.C.K 
The Bible and Polygamy: A Study of Hebrew and Christian Teaching (1958); S.P.C.K 
A Daily Bible and Prayerbook (1960); S.P.C.K  
Worship in the World's Religions (1961, 1974)
Comparative Religion (1962); Allen & Unwin
2nd edition (1975); Praeger 
The Faiths of Mankind: A Guide to The World's Living Religions (1965); Crowell
Revised (1967) as The Handbook of Living Religions Arthur Barker Ltd (England) 
Revised (1974) as The World's Living Religions; Pan Macmillan
A Book of World Religions (1965); Hulton Educational Publications  
The Christian Approach to the Animist (1966); Edinburgh House Press [Pamphlet]
The Christian Debate: Light from the East (1966); Doubleday & Co
African Mythology, Hamlyn Publ Group Ltd (1967), 
The Significance of the Bhagavad-Gītā for Christian Theology [Lecture] (1968); Dr. Williams's Trust 
What World Religions Teach Us (1968)
Religion in Africa (1969); Penguin 
2nd edition (1976) as Africa's Three Religions; Sheldon Press
Man and His Gods: Encyclopaedia of the World's Religions (1971)
U.S. title: Religions of the World: From Primitive Beliefs to Modern Faiths; Madison Square Press
Revised edition (1983) as World Religions: From Ancient History to the Present; Facts on File, 
A Dictionary of Non-Christian Religions, Westminster John Knox Press (1973), 
A Book of World Religions
Jesus in the Quran, Oneworld Publications (1995), 
Avatar and Incarnation: A Comparison of Indian & Christian Beliefs, London: Faber & Faber, (1970), Oxford University Press. (1982) 
Upanishads, Gita, and Bible: A Comparative Study of Hindu and Christian Scriptures, Harper & Row (1972), 
The Indestructible Soul: The Nature of Man and Life after Death in Indian Thought (1973); Allen & Unwin
The Bagavad Gita: A Verse Translation, Sheldon Press: London (1974), Dutton Books (1975), Oneworld Publications (1996) 
Something After Death? (1974); NCEC
The Wisdom of the Forest: Selections from the Hindu Upanishads, New York: New Directions, (1976), 
Mysticism in the World's Religions Sheldon Press in UK: 1976,  . Oxford University Press in USA: 1977,  . Oneworld Publications: 1995, 
The Wisdom of the Early Buddhists (1977); Directions
Sex in the World's Religions, Oxford University Press. (1980), 
Revised edition (1996) as Sexual Morality in the World's Religions, Oneworld Publications 
Encountering World Religions: Questions of Religious Truth, Crossroad Pub. Co. (1987), 
A Dictionary of Religious and Spiritual Quotations (1990); Routledge
2nd edition (2000) as The Routledge Dictionary of Religious and Spiritual Quotations; Routledge 
Collins Dictionary of Religious & Spiritual Quotations (1992); HarperCollins
Son of Joseph: The Parentage of Jesus, T. & T. Clark Publishers, Ltd. (1993), 
A Concise Encyclopedia of Christianity (1998); Oneworld Publications 
The Sayings Of The Buddha (1998); Ecco
Wisdom of Jesus, Oneworld Publications (2000), 
West African Psychology: a Comparative Study of Psychological and Religious Thought, James Clarke Company, (2002),

External links
Obituary in The Guardian

1910 births
2005 deaths
Academics of King's College London
British Methodists